Katarzyna Weiss (born 9 February 1970 in Mochy) is a Polish sprint canoeist who competed in the late 1980s. She finished eighth in the K-4 500 m event at the 1988 Summer Olympics in Seoul.

References
 Sports-reference.com profile

1970 births
Canoeists at the 1988 Summer Olympics
Living people
Olympic canoeists of Poland
Polish female canoeists
People from Wolsztyn County
Sportspeople from Greater Poland Voivodeship